Aaron Krickstein was the defending champion, but lost in the second round this year.

Ivan Lendl won the title, defeating Boris Becker in the final, 4–6, 6–3, 7–6(7–5).

Seeds

Draw

Finals

Top half

Section 1

Section 2

Bottom half

Section 3

Section 4

References

 Main Draw

Tokyo Indoor
Tokyo Indoor